David Gurevich is an American playwright and novelist of Russian origin.

David Gurevich was born as Vyacheslav Gurevich in Kharkov, Ukraine in 1951. His father was an Air Force pilot and his mother a doctor. He was one of a few Jewish students on the Interpreter department of the Moscow Institute of Foreign Languages (now Moscow Linguistic University). Jews were highly unwanted there, because they were considered not "ideologically reliable" enough for communicating with foreigners. But thanks to his outstanding abilities he managed to break through. Nevertheless, after the graduation there were practically no possibilities for a Jew to find any rewarding position in the Soviet system, so in 1976 he immigrated to the US, where he had changed a number of occupations till he found his real vocation as a writer, book and film critic, essayist.

Career
In 1987 his first novel, Travels with Dubinsky and Clive, was published by Viking. The memoir From Lenin to Lennon (Harcourt Brace, 1991) and another novel, Vodka for Breakfast, (ENC Press, 2003) followed.

His articles and book reviews have appeared in various publications, both in the USA and abroad. He wrote on the Russian mafia for Details (magazine), on Harold Robbins’ literary heritage for The New York Times Book Review, and on Yevgeny Zamyatin for The New Criterion. Other publications include The Wall Street Journal, The Guardian (London), The Forward, The Boston Globe, The American Spectator, Newsday, and others. He also reviews film for Images Journal, an online publication.

David Gurevich was the producer of the film "Empty Rooms" (directed by the outstanding Dutch director Willy Lindwer) about the Dolphinarium massacre on June 1, 2002, where twenty-one people died in the suicide bombing committed by Islamic Jihad outside Dolphinarium, a Tel Aviv disco.

Bibliography

References

Living people
1951 births
American film producers
American male journalists